The 2015 All-Pro Teams were named by the Associated Press (AP), the Pro Football Writers of America (PFWA), the Sporting News (SN), for performance in the 2015 NFL season. While none of the All-Pro teams have the official imprimatur of the NFL (whose official recognition is nomination to the 2016 Pro Bowl), they are included in the NFL Record and Fact Book and also part of the language of the 2011  NFLPA Collective Bargaining Agreement. Any player selected to the first-team of any of the teams can be described as an "All-Pro." The AP team, with first-team and second-team selections, was chosen by a national panel of fifty NFL writers and broadcasters. The Sporting News All-NFL team is voted on by NFL players and executives and was  released January 12, 2016. The PFWA team is selected by its more than 300 national members who are accredited media members covering the NFL.

Teams

Key
 AP = Associated Press first-team All-Pro
 AP-2 = Associated Press second-team All-Pro
 AP-2t = Tied for second-team All-Pro in the AP vote
 PFWA = Pro Football Writers Association All-NFL
 SN = Sporting News All-Pro

Position differences
 AP named a fullback; SN and PFWA did not.
 AP named two inside linebackers; SN and PFWA named one.
 AP named three outside linebackers in 2015 due to a 2nd-place tie vote.
 AP named three special teams players: kicker, punter, kick returner.
 PFWA named five special teams players: K, P, KR, PR, special teams.
 SN named four special teams players: K, P, KR, punt returner.

Notes

References

All-Pro Teams
2015 National Football League season